Saphou Lassy is a Gabonese former footballer who last played for PSS Sleman in Indonesia.

Career

Flying his trade with Malaysian club Sabah FA in 1998, Lassy put in a number of high-level performances for the Rhinos during his time there, scoring a hat-trick  to make it 4-1 in a Malaysia Cup group stage round opposing Pahang FA and repeating the feat as Sabah beat Brunei FA 6-0 to reach the semi-finals of the tournament. Overall, he tallied 12 goals in all competitions throughout his stay there.

Negotiating a move to PSS Sleman in early 2005, the Gabonese forward was denied a contract there, with the club saying that he was not good enough.

Lassy was replaced by Brazilian Cristiano de Oliveira for PSM Makassar as the management saw him as indolent and insouciant.

References

Gabonese footballers
Gabonese expatriate footballers
Gabonese expatriate sportspeople in Indonesia
Gabonese expatriate sportspeople in Malaysia
Living people
Association football forwards
Indonesian Premier Division players
PSM Makassar players
Persikota Tangerang players
PSS Sleman players
Expatriate footballers in Indonesia
Expatriate footballers in Malaysia
Sabah F.C. (Malaysia) players
Year of birth missing (living people)
21st-century Gabonese people